The Australian Film Institute (AFI) was founded in 1958 as a non-profit organisation devoted to developing an active film culture in Australia and fostering engagement between the general public and the Australian film industry. It is responsible for producing Australia's premier annual film and television awards, the AACTA Awards (previously the AFI Awards).

Overview
The work of the institute is supported by government funding, corporate sponsors and approximately 10,000 members nationally. As Australia's foremost motion picture industry association, AFI promotes the Australian film and television industry and plays a central role in the way in which the Australian film industry is known and understood, both locally and internationally.

In the 1970s, the AFI played a prominent part in reviving the Australian film industry and in convincing the government to invest in the creation of the Experimental Film Fund, a film school, and a corporation for advancing feature film production. The year 1976 marked the first time that the AFI Awards, which had been given since 1958, were televised.  Ten years later, television categories were added to the awards.

A recent focus of the organisation has been on helping to develop the careers of Australian film artists, through the AFI Fellowship and AFI Documentary Trailbrazer programs, as well as with the AFI Young Film Actor Award.

The AFI is affiliated with the Los Angeles Australian Film & Television Association. In August 2011, AFI formed a subsidiary professional organisation, the Australian Academy of Cinema and Television Arts.

AFI Research Collection
The AFI Research Collection  is a significant non-lending, specialist film and television industry resource. The collection operates under the auspices of Royal Melbourne Institute of Technology's School of Media and Communication in conjunction with the Australian Film Institute. The Collection has particular strengths in screen history and theory and in Australian cinema, and features a diverse range of books, journals, film scripts, film directories, reports and film festival catalogues.

See also
Cinema of Australia
Culture of Australia

References

External links
AFI website
 AFI Awards 2010 coverage @ Mediasearch
AFI History

 
1958 establishments in Australia
Australian Academy of Cinema and Television Arts
Film organisations in Australia
Organisations based in Melbourne
Organizations established in 1958
Television organisations in Australia